Power Inc. Volume 1 is a compilation album by the American industrial hip-hop group Tackhead. It was released in 1994 on Blanc Records.

Track listing

Personnel 

Tackhead
Keith LeBlanc – drums, percussion
Skip McDonald – guitar
Adrian Sherwood – sampler, programming
Doug Wimbish – bass guitar

Technical personnel
Jill Mumford – design
Mark Stewart – design
Tackhead – producer

Release history

References 

1994 compilation albums
Tackhead albums